Nerthra fuscipes is a species of toad bug in the family Gelastocoridae. It is found in the Caribbean, Central America, North America, and South America.

References

Further reading

External links

 

Gelastocoridae